The George Westinghouse Medal is named for George Westinghouse and awarded to in honor of "eminent achievement or distinguished service in the power field of mechanical engineering" by the American Society of Mechanical Engineers. There is a Gold medal (with a $1500 award) and a Silver medal (with a $1000 award). The silver medal may only be awarded to someone under 45 years of age.

Recipients
Source: ASME

Gold

 1953: Alexander G. Christie
 1954: Walker L. Cisler
 1955: Hyman G. Rickover
 1956: Perry W. Pratt
 1957: Alfred Iddles
 1958: Frederick P. Fairchild
 1960: Ernest C. Gaston
 1961: Gerald V. Williamson
 1962: Edwin H. Kreig
 1963: Abbott L. Penniman, Jr.
 1964: Frederick W. Argue
 1965: Robert A. Bowman
 1966: Robert C. Allen
 1967: Robert A. Baker, Sr.
 1968: Roland A. Budenholzer
 1969: Ralph C. Roe
 1970: Charles A. Meyer, Robert C. Spencer, Jr.
 1971: Wilfred McGregor Hall
 1972: William S. Lee
 1973: Bernard F. Langer
 1974: Charles W. Elston
 1976: John W. Simpson
 1978: Peter Fortescue
 1979: William R. Gould
 1980: Fred J. Moody
 1981: Earle C. Miller
 1982: William T. Reid
 1983: Eugene P. Wilkinson
 1984: Joseph R. Szydlowski
 1985: Eugene A. Saltarelli
 1986: Richard J. Coar
 1987: Henry O. Pohl
 1988: Warren A. Rhoades, Jr.
 1989: J. Ed Smith
 1990: John J. Taylor
 1991: Ralph J. Ortolano
 1992: Daniel R. Wilkins
 1993: Frederick W. Buckman
 1995: Thomas H. McCloskey
 1998: Ashwani K. Gupta
 1999: Atambir S. Rao
 2000: David G. Lilley
 2001: Janos M. Beer
 2002: Arthur H. Lefebvre
 2003: Yassin A. Hassan
 2004: Adel F. Sarofim
 2005: Subramanyam R. Gollahalli
 2006: Ben T. Zinn
 2007: Roman Weber
 2008: Edwin A. Harvego
 2009: Essam E. Khalil
 2010: Wlodzimierz Blasiak
 2011: Nicholas Syred
 2012: Richard R. Schultz
 2013: Yiannis A. Levendis
 2014: Ryoichi S. Amano
 2015: Karen A. Thole
 2016: Kenneth Bray
 2017: Alan Williams
 2018: Timothy C. Lieuwen
 2019: Hameed Metghalchi

Silver

 1972: William E. Rice
 1973: Michael A. Ambrose
 1974: Shelby L. Owens
 1976: Richard V. Shanklin III
 1977: James C. Corman
 1978: Romano Salvatori
 1979: Edward W. Stenby
 1980: Robert L. Gamble
 1981: Ronald Pigott
 1982: Leslie D. Kramer
 1983: Remco P. Waszink
 1984: William J. Bryan
 1986: Joseph A. Barsin
 1987: Albert D. LaRue
 1989: Leslie D. Kramer
 1990: Atambir S. Rao
 1991: John B. Kitto, Jr.
 1993: Stephen R. Reid
 1995: V.K. "Bindi" Chexal
 1998: Ting Wang
 2001: Susumu Mochida
 2003: Jason E. Jenkins
 2005: Andrzej Szlek
 2009: Somrat Kerdsuwan
 2010: Timothy C. Lieuwen
 2011: Margaret S. Wooldridge
 2012: Weihong Yang
 2015: Angela Violi
 2016: Elia Merzari
 2017: Frédéric Villeneuve

See also
 List of mechanical engineering awards

References

External links
ASME: George Westinghouse Medals

Awards of the American Society of Mechanical Engineers